The Carpet Frogs are a Toronto-based rock band. They are known for their work performing at private events and touring with Randy Bachman and Burton Cummings and have performed on Canada's Walk of Fame, Juno Awards, Live 8 Canada, SOCAN Awards, and more.

History
The Carpet Frogs performed as Burton Cummings' backup band on his 2008 album, Above the Ground. In 2016 The Carpet Frogs performed at the Juno Awards ceremony. In 2018 they performed with Cummings at a concert in Windsor.

Personnel

Current members
Nick Sinopoli - Percussion and vocals
Jeff Jones - Bass guitar and vocals (Known for his work with Tom Cochrane and Red Rider, Ocean, Gowan and Infidels)
Michael Zweig - Guitar and vocals
Gerry Finn - Guitar & Vocals 
Sean Fitzsimons - Drums and vocals

Past members
Greg Godovitz  (Goddo)
 David Love
 Jim Nielsen    (Bass)
 Mike Hall      (Killer dwarfs)
 Mike McDonald  (Bayou Boys)
 Lawrence Grecchi (original member)
 Steve Jensen (original member)
 Tim Bovaconti (replaced Michael in Bachman Cummings band 2007)
 Leonardo Valvassori

Discography

Albums
1994 – Frog Curry
1994 – Christmas All Over the World (4-song holiday set)
1995 – Adult Rock No. 5
1995 – Album Network In Store Play 34
2000 – Bullseye's Compact Christmas 2000
2001 – Takin' Care of Christmas
2003 – Everything is Beautiful
2006 – Pretending To Fly
2006 – Bachman Cummings, First Time Around DVD/cd sonybmg
2007 – Jukebox (Bachman Cummings Band)
2008 – Above The Ground, Burton Cummings, Sony/BMG
2012 –  Massey Hall  Burton Cummings Live .Universal Music Canada

DVD
2005 – Live 8 concert, Barrie
2006 – First Time Around Bachman Cummings DVD available
2008 – Above The Ground DVD -Burton Cummings disc
2010 – various Winter Olympic clips from Burton Cummings Feb 25th performance TV Show

References
Notes

External links
 The Carpet Frogs official website
 The Carpet Frogs' Management site website Sam Boyd
 CanadianBands.com entry
 Live 8 concert, Barrie

Musical groups with year of establishment missing
Musical groups from Toronto
Canadian rock music groups
Musical groups established in 1994
1994 establishments in Ontario